Market and 9th Street (eastbound) and Market and Larkin (westbound) are a pair of one-way light rail stations in San Francisco, California, United States, serving the San Francisco Municipal Railway F Market & Wharves heritage railway line. They are located on Market Street at the intersections of 9th Street and Larkin Street. The low-level platforms are also utilized by several bus and trolleybus routes.

Under the planned Better Market Street project, this stop would be eliminated to reduce travel times.

References 

San Francisco Municipal Railway streetcar stations